Danois is a surname. Notable people with the surname include:

 Édouard Le Danois (1887–1968), French zoologist
 Jacques Danois (1927–2008), pseudonym of Jacques Maricq, Belgian reporter and writer
 Johanna Danois (born 1987), French sprinter
 Maeva Danois (born 1993), French runner 
 Yseult Le Danois (1920–1985), French zoologist